Hobsonville Point Secondary School is a state coeducational secondary school located in the Auckland, New Zealand suburb of Hobsonville. Opened in February 2014, it is the second school in New Zealand (and first secondary school) to be built under a public-private partnership, whereby the school buildings are constructed, maintained and managed separate from the school management by a private consortium.

History
The school was constructed as part of the Hobsonville Point housing development, serving the 3000 new homes being built on the former RNZAF Hobsonville Airbase and the wider Hobsonville/West Harbour area and easing roll capacity on existing nearby secondary schools. The school was planned to eventually take up to 1500 students.

The public-private partnership (PPP) for the school and the nearby Hobsonville Point Primary School (the first PPP school in New Zealand) was signed in April 2012, with the 25-year contract for the design, construction, maintenance, finance and management of the school buildings being let to the Learning Infrastructure Partners consortium of ASC Architects, Perumal Pedavoli Architects, Hawkins Construction, and Programmed Facility Management. At the end of the 25-year contract (i.e. in 2037), the school buildings will revert ownership to the Crown. It was estimated by the National Government that the partnership would save it $2 million over the 25-year contract. However, the partnership was criticised by the Labour Opposition in that it would cost taxpayers more than it would save, namely from the $3.5 million cost of developing the business plan and the $2.5 million cost of a "Relationships Manager" communicating between the schools' board of trustees and the private consortium over 25 years.

Construction of the school started in 2012. On 6 December 2012, a tornado hit the Hobsonville area and caused several large concrete panels at the school site to topple over onto a truck, killing three construction workers sheltering in the truck's cab. A memorial for the victims is located out the front of the school.

Hobsonville Point Secondary School opened for instruction for the first time on 3 February 2014, initially taking Year 9 students only. The new school buildings were not fully complete at the time, so the school was based at Hobsonville Point Primary School for the first four weeks. The school's opening roll was 125.

Demographics
At the school's first Education Review Office review in June 2014, Hobsonville Point Secondary School had 124 students enrolled. Fifty-five percent of students were male and 45 percent were female. Sixty-eight percent of students identified as New Zealand European (Pākehā), 16 percent as Asian, six percent identified as Māori, four percent as Pacific Islanders, and six percent as another ethnicity.

Hobsonville Point Secondary School has a socio-economic decile of 10 (step Z), meaning it draws its school community from areas of high socioeconomic status when compared to other New Zealand schools. The school was recategorised from decile 9 (step Q) in January 2015, as part of the nationwide review of deciles following the 2013 census.

References

External links
School website

Educational institutions established in 2014
Secondary schools in Auckland
2014 establishments in New Zealand
Schools in West Auckland, New Zealand